Type D or D-Type may refer to:

 D-type asteroid
 Jaguar D-Type, a sports racing car
 Honda D-Type, a motorcycle
 Type D personality,  a concept used in the field of medical psychology
 Type D plug, a type of electrical power plug
 Type-D destroyer, ships of the Imperial Japanese Navy
 Type D escort ship, ships of the Imperial Japanese Navy
 Type D submarine, submarines of the Imperial Japanese Navy
 Avro Type D, a 1911 aircraft
 Audi Type D, a car
 Auto Union Type D, a Grand Prix racing car
 Caudron Type D, a 1911 aircraft
 Blackburn Type D, a 1912 aircraft
 Handley Page Type D, a 1910 aircraft
 Petrov type D, an algebraic classification

See also
 Class D (disambiguation)
 Model D (disambiguation)